Pertunmaa is a municipality of Finland located in the Southern Savonia region.
is water.

Neighbour municipalities are Hartola, Heinola, Hirvensalmi, Mäntyharju and Joutsa. Pertunmaa became an independent municipality in 1926 when it was separated from Mäntyharju. Hartola's old wooden church was moved to Pertunmaa and it was inaugurated in 1927.

The language of the municipality is Finnish.

Culture

It's said that Pertunmaa's culture is mixed with two regions: Southern Savonia and Päijänne Tavastia. Also, Itä-Häme (literally "East Tavastia") newspaper is also distributed in Pertunmaa.

According to a common legend in the locality, Pertunmaa is named after a man called Perttu, who once ruled the whole of Pertunmaa (literally the "land of Perttu") alone. The coat of arms of the municipality, the explanation of which is “a golden flame in a red field with a black ear,” has its origins in the slash-and-burn cultivation in ancient times. The coat of arms, designed by Tapio Vallioja, was approved at a meeting of the Pertunmaa Municipal Council on April 14, 1965, and the coat of arms was officially approved for use by the Ministry of the Interior on July 1 of that year.

In the 1980s, blodpalt called Kisko, and Rieska breads baked from rye flour, cream and sour cream, which are baked with cabbage leaves, were named Pertunmaa's traditional dishes.

Villages

Pertunmaa's church village (Pertunmaan kirkonkylä) and Kuortti are the largest and most populous villages of the municipality.

Other smaller villages are Hartosenpää, Hölttä, Joutsjärvi, Karankamäki, Kuhajärvi, Kälkyttä, Lihavanpää, Mansikkamäki, Nipuli and Ruorasmäki.

Notable people
 Jari Leppä, the Minister of Agriculture and Forestry
 Vesa Törnroos, a sports shooter
 Kari Uotila, a politician

References

External links

Municipality of Pertunmaa – Official website, english, finnish and russian languages

 
Populated places established in 1926